Tržić Tounjski is a village in Croatia, under the Tounj municipality, in Karlovac County.

References

Geography of Croatia
Populated places in Karlovac County